The 1963 Colgate Red Raiders football team was an American football team that represented Colgate University as an independent during the 1963 NCAA University Division football season. In its second consecutive season under head coach Hal Lahar (his seventh overall), the team compiled a 3–4–1 record. James Yurak was the team captain. 

Only eight games were played, rather than the usual nine, because the Red Raiders' traditional season-ending matchup with Brown University, slated for Nov. 23, 1963, was canceled following the previous day's assassination of John F. Kennedy.

The team played its home games at Colgate Athletic Field in Hamilton, New York.

Schedule

Leading players 
Statistical leaders for the 1963 Red Raiders included: 
 Rushing: Donald Court, 258 yards and 3 touchdowns on 48 attempts
 Passing: Gerald Barudin, 580 yards, 58 completions and 2 touchdowns on 131 attempts
 Receiving: Lee Woltman, 103 yards on 14 receptions
 Total offense: Gerald Barudin, 751 yards (580 passing, 171 rushing)
 Scoring: Thomas Carpenter, 24 points from 4 touchdowns
 All-purpose yards: Lee Woltman, 477 yards (203 kickoff returning, 149 rushing, 103 receiving, 22 punt returning)

References

Colgate
Colgate Raiders football seasons
Colgate Red Raiders football